Rika Vagiani, artist name for Marika Zoula (1962 – 7 August 2018), was a Greek actress, journalist, politician, editor of magazines and children's book writer.

She was born in Athens district of Pangrati from journalist Odysseas Zoulas and Varvara Drakou. Her career as actress began on 1979 and graduated from National Theatre of Greece Drama School on 1982. Soon she started to work as editor-in-chief in the magazines Cosmopolitan and Colt, and the newspapers Apogevmatini and Ethnos as a daily columnist.

She began presenting on TV in shows on Mega Channel, Star, Seven X, Channel X and ERT. She co-founded the news site Protagon, where she published two children's books. In 1986, she began presenting on television, with featuring in shows on Mega, Star, Seven X, Channel 5 and, since 1997, with the state broadcaster ERT, which she has remained until 2012. She also contributed to the Protagon website and penned two children’s books.

Her artistic name "Rika Vagiani" came from the first syllable of the name of Barbara's mother "Va-" and the name of Yiannis Diakoyiannis' father-yanis. Her husband was Nikos Stefanis, with whom she had a son, Odysseus. She died on 7 August 2018 of lung cancer.

References

1962 births
2018 deaths
Greek film actresses
Greek stage actresses
Greek television actresses
Greek television presenters
Greek journalists
Actresses from Athens
Greek women journalists
Greek editors
Greek women editors
Greek women television presenters